Lammersville Unified School district (LUSD) (formerly known as Lammersville Elementary School District) is a pre-kindergarten through twelfth grade unified school district in Mountain House, California, which serves the area west of Tracy and parts of Alameda County. The district was created when majority of voters in the Lammersville and Mountain House area passed a measure to separate from Tracy Unified School District in a special election on June 8, 2010. It became an independent school district on July 1, 2011.

District office
The district opened a 7,000-square-foot (650.32 m²) new district office on 111 S. DeAnza Blvd.

History
Lammersville Elementary School District started out as one-school school district and was established in 1876. Its biggest growth started in 2005 when the Mountain House community was established. Lammersville Joint Unified School District has plans for 12 K-8 schools and one comprehensive high school, with up to 10,000 total students. The district currently serves 5,955 students in the seven K-8 schools (Altamont, Bethany, Cordes, Hansen, Lammersville, Questa and Wicklund) and Mountain House High School.

Schools
Altamont Elementary School, Mountain House
Bethany Elementary School, Mountain House
Julius Cordes Elementary School, Mountain House
Lammersville Elementary School, Oakley
Mountain House High School, Mountain House
Peter Hansen Elementary School, Mountain House
Sebastian Questa Elementary School, Mountain House
Wicklund Elementary School, Mountain House

Website
Lammersville School District

References

School districts in San Joaquin County, California
School districts established in 2011
2011 establishments in California